The London Underground Circle Stock consisted of 90 cars renovated in 1934 at Acton Works, selected by the LPTB from earlier Metropolitan Railway stock - 59 of which dated from 1921 but four were 1905 clerestory roofed cars. The vehicles were externally repainted in a red-and-cream livery at first; later all-red.

The 90 cars were 36 Driving Motors (DM), 36 trailers, and 18 control trailers (CT), running in 5-car trains for a 14 train service (seven for each route). The control trailers had their driving equipment removed, but were needed in the formation as they had the first class accommodation. Included in renovation undertaken at Acton works was the installation of communicating doors in the car ends, reupholstering, removal of luggage compartments on DM cars, installing standard light fittings and repainting in its new livery.
 
They were finally withdrawn on 31 December 1950, being replaced by 5-car trains of P Stock, which had previously been used on the Uxbridge branch of the Metropolitan Line. Disposals started in Oct 1950.

Fleet details
Car 2564 was damaged beyond repair in a collision at Charing Cross, now known as Embankment, on 17 May 1938. The car was scrapped on 22 June 1939 and replaced by car 2552 which was a 1913 stock car numbered 105. The bogies and motors from 2564 was transferred to the replacement car.
Car 2589 was destroyed by enemy action at Kings Cross on 9 March 1941. It was scrapped on 2 May 1941 and replaced by car 2558, a 1905 stock car previously numbered 68.

References

A
Train-related introductions in 1934